Chelsea Lovely Cabias Fernandez (born March 14, 1999) is a Filipino model and beauty pageant titleholder, who was crowned as Binibining Pilipinas Globe 2022. She represented the Philippines at The Miss Globe 2022 in Tirana, Albania and finished as a Top 15 Semifinalist.

References

External links

1999 births
Living people
Binibining Pilipinas winners
People from Tacloban
Filipino female models